Šljivovica is a fruit brandy.

Šljivovica may also refer to:

 Šljivovica, Čajetina, a village in the municipality of Čajetina, Serbia
 Šljivovica, Vushtrri, a village in the municipality of Vushtrri, Kosovo